Rubus vermontanus is a North American species of bristleberry in section Setosi of the genus Rubus, a member of the rose family. It is found in eastern and central Canada (Québec, Ontario, Newfoundland, and all 3 Maritime Provinces) and the northeastern and north-central United States (Minnesota, Wisconsin, Michigan, Pennsylvania, New York, and all 6 New England States).

References

External links
 

vermontanus
Flora of Eastern Canada
Flora of the Northeastern United States
Flora of the Great Lakes region (North America)
Flora of Vermont
Plants described in 1904
Flora without expected TNC conservation status